United Nations Security Council resolution 1131, adopted unanimously on 29 September 1997, after recalling all previous resolutions on the Western Sahara, the Council extended the mandate of the United Nations Mission for the Referendum in Western Sahara (MINURSO) until 20 October 1997.

The resolution expressed satisfaction that both Morocco and the Polisario Front had co-operated with the Secretary-General's Personal Envoy and reiterated its commitment to the holding of a free, fair and impartial referendum for the self-determination for the people of Western Sahara.

MINURSO's mandate was extended to prepare for the resumption of the process of identifying prospective voters and to enable concerned members of the council to engage in consultations with their authorities on the proposed expansion of the operation. The council also endorsed Kofi Annan's recommendation that MINURSO be extended until 20 April 1998 to continue with the identification process.

See also
 History of Western Sahara
 List of United Nations Security Council Resolutions 1101 to 1200 (1997–1998)
 Sahrawi Arab Democratic Republic
 Wall (Western Sahara)

References

External links
 
Text of the Resolution at undocs.org

 1131
 1131
1997 in Morocco
September 1997 events
1990s in Western Sahara